Wellington Hunt "Wimpy" Quinn (May 14, 1918 – September 1, 1954) was a Major League Baseball pitcher who pitched in three games for the Chicago Cubs in 1941. He threw five innings, all in relief.

Quinn played thirteen seasons in the minor leagues, mainly playing first base, but never played that position in the majors. In 1951, his final professional season, he served as player-manager of the Bakersfield Indians.

References

External links

1918 births
1954 deaths
Major League Baseball pitchers
Chicago Cubs players
Vancouver Capilanos players
Madison Blues players
Los Angeles Angels (minor league) players
Bakersfield Indians players
San Diego Padres (minor league) players
Tacoma Tigers players
Oregon Ducks baseball players
Oregon Ducks men's basketball players
Toronto Huskies draft picks
Baseball players from Alabama